Neobracea is a genus of plant in the family Apocynaceae first described as a genus in 1905. It was first given the name Bracea, but this turned out to be an illegitimate homonym. In other words, somebody else had already used it for another plant. Neobracea is native to Cuba and the Bahamas.

Species
 Neobracea acunana Lippold - E Cuba
 Neobracea angustifolia Britton - W Cuba
 Neobracea bahamensis (Britton) Britton - Bahamas, Cuba
 Neobracea ekmanii Urb. - E Cuba
 Neobracea howardii Woodson - EC Cuba
 Neobracea martiana Borhidi & O.Muñiz - E Cuba
 Neobracea susannina Borhidi - E Cuba
 Neobracea valenzuelana (A.Rich.) Urb. - Cuba

References

Malouetieae
Apocynaceae genera